Hoei may refer to:
 Hōei, a Japanese era name
 , the Japanese name for Physonectae
 Banpresto, a Japanese toy company previously known as Hoei Sangyo
 Huy, a municipality in Liège, Belgium